Lamprotes c-aureum is a moth of the family Noctuidae. It is found from Southern Scandinavia to the Southern Alps and from Western Europe up to West Siberia.

The wingspan is 34–40 mm. The moths are on wing from June to September depending on the location.

The larvae feed on Thalictrum species, such as Thalictrum flavum and Thalictrum aquilegiifolium and Aquilegia vulgaris.

External links

Fauna Europaea
Lepiforum.de
Vlindernet.nl 

Plusiinae
Moths of Europe
Moths described in 1781